The 1950 Volta a Catalunya was the 30th edition of the Volta a Catalunya cycle race and was held from 17 September to 24 September 1950. The race started in Montjuïc and finished in Barcelona. The race was won by Antonio Gelabert.

General classification

References

1950
Volta
1950 in Spanish road cycling
September 1950 sports events in Europe